Iravani (lit. "from Iravan", aka, Yerevan) is a common surname in Iran, Azerbaijan and to a much lesser extent in the rest of the Caucasus.

People
 Haji-Mollah Abbas Iravani, other name of Haji Mirza Aqasi, prime minister of Qajar Iran between 1835-1848 
 Mehdi Vaez-Iravani, Iranian scientist
 Ahmad Iravani,  Iranian philosopher, scholar and clergyman
 Reza Iravani, Iranian-Canadian professor
 Fazil Iravani, Second Sheikh ul-Islam of the Caucasus
 Mirza Kadym Irevani, Azerbaijani ornamentalist artist and portraitist, founder of Azerbaijani panel painting

See also
 Sardar Iravani, a title assumed by the last khan (governor) of the Erivan Khanate of Persia, which also became the eponymous namesake of the Qajar "Sardari Iravani" royal family branch.

References

Persian-language surnames
Azerbaijani-language surnames
Yerevan